was a town located in Taka District, Hyōgo, Japan.

As of 2003, the town had an estimated population of 7,873 and a density of 222.78 persons per km2. The total area was 35.34 km2.

On October 1, 2005, Kurodashō was merged into the expanded city of Nishiwaki.

Dissolved municipalities of Hyōgo Prefecture
Nishiwaki, Hyōgo